Bozcaarmut (literally "blemished pear" in Turkish) may refer to the following places in Turkey:

 Bozcaarmut, Göynük, a village in the district of Göynük, Bolu Province
 Bozcaarmut, Pazaryeri, a village in the district of Pazaryeri, Bilecik Province

See also
 Bozarmut (disambiguation)